Federico Cornaro may refer to:

Federico Cornaro (died 1382), Venetian statesman and entrepreneur
Federico Cornaro (1531–1590), Roman Catholic cardinal
Federico Baldissera Bartolomeo Cornaro (1579–1653), Roman Catholic cardinal